Lodestone Theatre Ensemble was a non-profit Asian American theatre organization in Los Angeles, founded in 1999. It was a membership-driven organization. The ensemble disbanded in 2009.

History 
In 1995, following the 1992 Los Angeles riots, veteran actor Soon-Tek Oh created the Society of Heritage Performers (SHP), a Korean American theatre ensemble. SHP evolved into Lodestone Theatre Ensemble in 1999, organized by original founders: actors Alexandra Bokyun Chun, Tim Lounibos and Chil Kong, and writer Philip W. Chung. Their new focus was embracing a broader Asian Pacific American identity.   Chung and Kong remain as present co-artistic directors.

In 2009, Kong appeared on the GSN game show, Catch 21, starring Alfonso Ribeiro and Mikki Padilla, finishing in second place.

Programs 
Lodestone Theatre Ensemble has presented over 75 mainstage productions, special events, and readings/workshops of both new and established works. New works are presented in the "Yellow Box" reading series. Theatre for Teens and Youth Outreach programs aid disadvantaged youth in partnership with Asian Pacific Health Care Venture, Korean Youth Cultural Center and Asian Youth Center. Mainstage productions are done in residence at the GTC (Grove Theatre Center) in Burbank, California.

Productions

1999
 Texas by Judy Soo Hoo
 Laughter, Joy & Loneliness & Sex & Sex & Sex & Sex by Philip W. Chung

2000
 American Monsters by Philip W. Chung, Matt Pelfrey, Judy Soo Hoo

2001
 A Dirty Secret Between the Toes by Annette Lee
 Terminus Americana by Matt Pelfrey

2002
 Freak Storm by Matt Pelfrey
 Refrigerators by Judy Soo Hoo
 When Tigers Smoked Long Pipes by Angela Kang

2004
 Claim to Fame by Isaac Ho

2005
 Solve For X by Judy Soo Hoo
 American Monsters 2 by Corinne Chooey, Isaac Ho, Angela Kang, Oanh Ly, Judy Soo Hoo

2006
 The Golden Hour by Philip W. Chung
 One Nation, Under God by Philip W. Chung

2007
 Telemongol (with sketch comedy troupes, OPM and 18 Mighty Mountain Warriors, and improv group Cold Tofu)
 The Mikado Project by Doris Baizley & Ken Narasaki
 The Trojan Women by Euripides, translated by Kenneth Cavender

2008
 Trapezoid by Nic Cha Kim
 Suddenly, Last Summer by Tennessee Williams

2009
 Ten to Life by Nic Cha Kim, Annette Lee, Tim Lounibos, and Judy Soo Hoo

References

External links 
 (archived)
Lodestone Theatre Ensemble profiled on AsianWeek.com (2002)

Asian-American organizations
Asian-American theatre
1999 establishments in California
Non-profit organizations based in California
Theatre companies in Los Angeles